Apple of Universal Gravity, also referred to by its Japanese title , is a compilation album by Japanese musician Ringo Sheena. It was released through EMI Records on November 13, 2019, and became Sheena's first number-one album in Japan in 10 years, debuting atop the Oricon Albums Chart with 97,200 physical sales. It also topped the Billboard Japan Hot Albums chart.

Album title
The album's English and Japanese title refer to Newton's apple, as well as Isaac Newton's law of universal gravitation. It is also a reference to Sheena's stage name Ringo, which means "apple" in Japanese.

Track listing

Charts

Weekly charts

Year-end charts

References

2019 compilation albums
Ringo Sheena albums
Japanese-language compilation albums

EMI Records compilation albums
Universal Music Group compilation albums